Haverhill Railway Walks is a 14.1 hectare Local Nature Reserve in Haverhill in Suffolk. It is owned and managed by West Suffolk Council.

This is a footpath along a three mile stretch of a closed section of the Stour Valley Railway. Much of it is covered with scrub and large trees, and it provides a wildlife corridor for a diverse range of fauna and flora through the centre of Haverhill.

References

Local Nature Reserves in Suffolk
Haverhill, Suffolk